Frederick Archibald Burgon (born 28 March 1912 in Nottingham–died 1994) was a professional footballer who played for Colwick, Burton Joyce, Grantham Town, Notts County, Newark Town, Tottenham Hotspur, Wrexham and Carlisle United.

Football career 
Burgon played for non League football clubs Colwick, Burton Joyce and Grantham Town before being given a trial at Notts County in 1930. After a spell with Newark Town the outside left returned to Notts County in 1932 where he featured in 26 matches and scoring seven goals. He went on to play for Grantham for a second time before signing for Tottenham Hotspur in 1934. Burgon played a total of four matches for the Lilywhites. In 1935, Burgon joined Wrexham where he went on to make 140 appearances and score 36 goals between 1935–38. Burgon ended his career at Carlisle United where he appeared in a further two matches.

References 

1912 births
1994 deaths
Footballers from Nottingham
English footballers
English Football League players
Grantham Town F.C. players
Notts County F.C. players
Tottenham Hotspur F.C. players
Wrexham A.F.C. players
Carlisle United F.C. players
Newark Town F.C. players
Association football outside forwards